Princes is a novel written by the award-winning Australian novelist Sonya Hartnett. It was first published in 1997 in Australia by Viking. It is a novel that isn't completely horror, but not for the weak-hearted as it has chapters about horror stories, death, poisoning, rats, dissecting, murder, imprisonment in your own house by your twin, swearing, illness and many other subjects that would make certain people squirm. It is a young adult book. Princes is a strange book, that explores the reason for hatred, psychological differences and seeing the inside of people, not out.

1997 Australian novels
Novels by Sonya Hartnett
Viking Press books